PRIMA is one of the interbank networks in Indonesia. PRIMA is owned by PT Rintis Sejahtera. PT Rintis Sejahtera is a Satellite Communication services provider that transmitting digital information within the region and around the world. Before the creation of ATM PRIMA, this network was known as ATM BCA network that worked as the ATM network for Bank Central Asia.

Services
 PRIMAMESH
 PRIMALINK
 PRIMASTAR
 PRIMANET
 EFT SWITCHING, the Interbank network
 BROADBAND

Members
 Bank Central Asia
 Bank Muamalat
 Bank Jabar Banten
 Bank Mayapada
 Bank Ekonomi
 Bank Mega
 The Bank of Tokyo-Mitsubishi, Ltd. Jakarta Branch
 Bank Bukopin
 Bank Rakyat Indonesia
 Bank Sumsel
 Bank Permata
 Bank Bumi Arta
 Royal Bank of Scotland Indonesia, before ABN AMRO
 Bank Nusantara Parahyangan
 Bank Jasa Jakarta
 Bank BPD Jateng
 Bank OCBC NISP
 Bank BCA Syariah
 Bank BPD Kaltim
 Bank Victoria International
 Bank Pundi Indonesia
 Bank Maspion
 Bank Negara Indonesia 
 Rabobank Indonesia
 Commonwealth Bank Indonesia
 Bank Mandiri Syariah
 Bank Mega Syariah
 Bank Mandiri
 CIMB Niaga
 Bank Mutiara
 UOB Indonesia
 Bank KEB Hana Indonesia

References

External links
 
 PT Rintis Sejahtera website

Interbank networks
Financial services companies of Indonesia